is a manga series written and illustrated by Ken Ishikawa based on Getter Robo franchise created by Ishikawa and Go Nagai. It was first serialized in Futabasha's Super Robot Magazine from July 19, 2001 to September 19, 2003, compiling into 3 tankōbon volumes (2 aizōban volumes by Futabasha) until its premature cancellation. Taking place 10 years after both Shin Getter Robo and Getter Robo Go, it follows a new Getter Team led by Hayato to stop the invasion of the Andromeda Stellaration from invading Earth using the new mecha, Getter Robo Arc. An anime television series adaptation by Bee Media and Studio A-Cat aired from July to September 2021.

Plot
Nineteen years after Ryoma Nagare, Go Ichimonji and Messiah Tyr left Earth in the Shin Getter 1 to Mars, the world is recovering from a previous conflict that almost changed the planet forever. Upon that time, the conflict between Earth and an unknown entity known as the Andromeda Stellaration is escalating as swarms of technorganic insect-like aliens almost brought the planet to its knees. However the Saotome Institute, now under the command of Hayato Jin, is doing its best to repel the enemy while training new pilots for protecting Earth against extraterrestrial threats both from within and beyond the planet. All for to pilot a new Getter unit meant as the final legacy of Professor Saotome: Getter Robo Arc.

In the midst of the conflict, Takuma Nagare, a teenage boy and the only son of Ryoma is searching for answers about his own legacy guided by his friend Baku Yamagishi. During a battle between a metal beast and the Saotome Institute's Getter Team, Takuma and Baku hijacked a fallen Getter D2 after its pilot has died. Much to the dismay and curiosity of Hayato, he sent the Getter Arc piloted by Sho Kamui to assist Takuma on defeating the metal beast and was brought in to the institute. Seeing Takuma and Baku's potentials, Hayato assigned both alongside Sho to operate Getter Robo Arc as humanity's last hope against the Andromeda Stellaration to protect humanity from its own extinction.

Characters

Saotome Institute

A-19-year old boy and the only son of Ryoma Nagare, one of the original Getter Team pilots. During his childhood, his mother was killed by scientists who visited their home. Now searching for answers, he partnered up with Baku to go to the Saotome Institute to learn about his linage. Both brash but intelligent, he also inherits Ryoma's DNA, which gives him exceptional stamina and strength as well as superb regenerative capabilities. He is also shown not to like flashy weapons like his father, as he only uses a Revolver. As a Getter pilot, Takuma pilots the Getter Arc which focuses both in power and close combat.

A-19 year old Human-Dinosaur hybrid. Sho is the only son of Emperor Gore, the former ruler of the Dinosaur Empire. He was born from a human mother that Gore had kidnapped years ago, but despite all of that, she cared for him as her only child. He has a calm personality and is unrivaled in cold blood. Due to how he is born, his physical ability far exceeds his ordinary human beings and can endure Getter Ray radiation. His strength also allows him to deliver punches that are five times more powerful than ordinary humans. Also due to his relations to the Dinosaur Empire, he is right to succeed his half brother Emperor Gore III to the throne. Hayato, seeing his strengths, decided to accept him to the Saotome Institute after a truce between them and the Empire to take down the Andromeda Stellaration. As a Getter pilot, Sho pilots the Getter Kirik which focuses mainly in speed.

A 22-year old Zen Buddhist monk, Baku was the younger brother of Messiah Tyr. He is supportive to the younger Takuma on finding answers to his origins. He is also has good ability to sense Getter Rays while being good on electronics especially in hacking in several systems. As a Getter pilot, Baku pilots the Getter Khan which focuses mainly in defense.

One of the original 3 Getter Pilots and current head of the Saotome Institute. He has retired from piloting Getter Robo after his body starting to lag him behind and the events that occurred 19 years ago. He also served as Kamui's stepfather while being taken in by the institute.

A close friend of Professor Saotome and lead researcher in the Saotome Institute. He is kooky and rather unpredictable yet his smarts contributed to the institute's progress in Getter Ray research. He knew Takuma very well due to his relation to his father.

The major sergeant who trains both the Arc and D2 teams. He is also once a Getter pilot who commands Shin Getter-3 during the events of Shin Getter Robo when the Andromeda Stellaration started investigating Earth and coordinating their attacks in the Saotome Institute.

One of the pilots of Getter D2 who had died during an attack against the Andromeda Stellaration.

The original pilot of the Getter 1 and leader of the former Getter Team, alongside Hayato and Benkei. During the Andromeda Stellaration's attack in the Saotome Institute, he piloted the Shin Getter-1 to repel the first attack but never prevented Benkei's death after Getter Dragon destroyed the former part of the institute. He soon became one with the Getter Rays after his body fusing with Shin Getter-1 and left Earth for Mars.

One of the original pilots of Getter Robo, commanding Getter Poseidon and Shin Getter-3. He used the Getter Dragon to destroy the bugs that invaded the lab. But the sheer power inside Dragon killed him alongside Professor Saotome and some researchers in the institute, becoming one with the Getter Rays. With his spirit lingering inside Getter Dragon, he had finally found peace after the spirit of Professor Saotome told him to move on and let the new generation take care of future threats.

The founder of the Saotome Institute, who did research on Getter Rays and created several Getter Robo units to protect Earth from existential threats. He died during the Andromeda Stellaration's attack on the institute when Benkei overloaded the Getter Dragon and destroyed the place.

The leader of the Go Team, piloting the Getter Go. In the events prior to the series, he boarded the Shin Getter-1 until he became one with it alongside Ryoma and Messiah.

Allied Forces

The former member of the Go Team and pilot of Getter Sho, Sho is a retired pilot who leads the Allied Forces against the Andromeda Stellaration.

A former pilot in the US Army Forces in Getter Robo Go and admiral in the Allied Forces.

Dinosaur Empire

The former leader of the Dinosaur Empire, and the late father of Sho Kamui and Emperor Gore the 3rd. He was killed by Emperor Burai near the end of the original Getter Robo story. He appears in episode four of the anime as a ghost.

The current leader of the Dinosaur Empire, he is the successor to the former leader Emperor Gore. He is also Kamui's half brother, who doesn't really trust humans despite his faction calling a truce with the Saotome Institute during the invasion of the Andromeda Stellaration. Despite his position, his mindset was plagued with fear due to Kamui's approval to the people of the empire.

A close adviser and scientist of the Dinosaur Empire, who became Kamui's surrogate father after his mother was held hostage by the empire and Emperor Gore was killed. He is one of the few people who knew Kamui's true legacy and despite being a scientist, he is a very kind person. He developed the Getter Saurus, a replica Getter using technology from the Saotome Institute's research on Getter Rays and expertise on Mechasaurus development.

The general and military adviser to Emperor Gore, who had various battles with the Getter Robo. He is now retired and suffering from dementia.

,  and 

Kamui's childhood friends who all belong to the Ryu Clan, one of the lower class of the Saurian races. They all became pilots for Getter Saurus 19 years later. In the manga, their physical designs were different compared to how they look in the anime. Their names were also different in the manga, Vise was originally named Zor, while Ganryu and Gozuro were nameless.

Andromeda Stellaration

The leader of the Andromeda Stellaration, who had orchestrated several attacks on Earth due to their relation to Getter Rays. She is only mentioned in the manga, while in the anime, her appearance is shown in a hologram during her interactions with Komei.

The senior general in the Andromeda Stellaration, who has coordinating several attacks in the Saotome Institute in order to destroy it and the link to Getter Rays.

An American scientist who works with Andromeda Stellaration, responsible for the death of Ryoma Nagare's wife when he and his group were on search to seize Takuma 19 years ago. He is in fact a survivor of the Hundred Oni Empire after the group was defeated at the hands of Getter Dragon.

A warrior sent by the Andromeda Stellaration to lead an army of insector robots to attack the Saotome Intitute. He dresses in Chinese style warrior armor, and his name is derived from the Japanese words for Rabbit and Monkey. His design, characteristics and abilities also appear to be based on the legendary Chinese Monkey King (also known as Sun Wukong or Son Goku). He appears in episode 3 of the Anime.

Hundred Oni Empire

The emperor of the Hundred Oni Empire (Hyakki Empire) who was killed at the end of Getter Robo G. He is seen in a flashback in episode 6.

Getter Corps

A clone of the original Musashi Tomoe, who was one of the original getter pilots until his death. His clone was based on the memories inside Getter Emperor and was sent to Earth as a commander of the Getter Corps.

Others

Ryoma's wife and also Takuma's mother, who was murdered by Carter McDonald after he invaded her dojo 19 years ago.

The leader of the Green Earth cult and also Baku's older brother. 19 years ago during the Andromeda Stellaration's invasion of Earth, he became one with the Getter Rays after his body fusing with Shin Getter-1 and left Earth for Mars.

A former fiance of Hayato and self-defense force member who took part in the war against Professor Rando years ago during the events of Getter Robo Go and served as a second lieutenant. She died in an explosion after trying to defuse one of the bombs that Rando had planted in every country all over the world.

Media

Manga
Getter Robo Arc was both written and drawn by Ken Ishikawa. Created as the third installment of the Getter Robo series after Getter Robo Go, it was serialized in Futabasha's Super Robot Magazine from July 19, 2001 to September 19, 2003. However after all 3 volumes were published and "part 1" of the series has wrapped up, Ishikawa died on November 17, 2006, leaving the rest of the story unfinished. Futabasha later republished the manga in 2007 in an Aizoban edition and later in 2016 in a limited Kanzenban edition.

Anime
An anime television series adaptation produced by Bee Media and Studio A-Cat was announced by Bandai Namco Entertainment on November 2, 2020, and aired from July 4 to September 26, 2021 on AT-X, Tokyo MX, BS SkyPer! and BS11. Jun Kawagoe is directing the series, with Tadashi Hayakawa as writer and music composed by both Yoshichika Kuriyama and Shiho Terada. JAM Project performed both the series' opening theme song  and the series' ending themes: "Dragon 2021", "Storm 2021" and "Heats 2021".

Medialink licensed the series for streaming in Asia and will stream the series through their Ani-One Asia YouTube channel on the same date as the series premiere in Japan. Sentai Filmworks also licensed the series for release outside of Asia, with the series streaming on Hidive on July 4, 2021 for the subbed version and August 14, 2021 for the English dubbed version.

Episode list

Notes

References

External links
Official Website (Japanese)
MUSASHI NEVER DIES (Japanese)

 
2001 manga
2021 anime television series debuts
Futabasha manga
Medialink
Sentai Filmworks
Shōnen manga
Studio A-Cat
Super robot anime and manga